Kytococcus is a genus of Actinomycetota bacteria.

References

Micrococcales
Bacteria genera